The 2011 Oklahoma State vs. Iowa State football game, played November 18, 2011, was an NCAA college football game held between the Oklahoma State Cowboys and the Iowa State Cyclones at Jack Trice Stadium, the home stadium of Iowa State. The game had large implications as Oklahoma State controlled its own destiny for playing in the BCS National Championship Game. In a remarkable upset, Iowa State won in double overtime 37–31.

Pregame
Oklahoma State came into this game ranked #2 in the BCS and all major polls. Their dynamic air raid attack spearheaded them to a 10–0 record, the best undefeated start in school history. They came into the game averaging 51.7 points per game. The Cowboys had vaulted to #2 after #1 LSU defeated previous #2 Alabama a week earlier, and it was understood that the Cowboys would play in the BCS national championship game if they won out.

The day before the game, a tragic plane crash occurred that killed Oklahoma State women's basketball coach Kurt Budke and his assistant Miranda Serna. The crash was said to have a huge psychological impact on the normally potent Cowboys squad. Mike Gundy stated about the crash, “Honestly, the last thing that anybody wants to do, really, is play a game.”

ESPN's Joe Tessitore said before the game during their broadcast, "The Oklahoma State Cowboys have arrived in Ames, Iowa with heavy hearts. These coaches and players are dealing with tragic news. Women's basketball head coach Kurt Budke and assistant coach Miranda Serna were killed in a plane crash last night. In moments, another kickoff arrives before this undefeated team while an entire university community is overcome with grief." Before the game, Jack Trice Stadium observed a brief moment of silence for the lives lost in the plane crash.

The game
The Cowboys raced to a 24–7 lead early into the third quarter. Iowa State scored 17 straight points to tie the game, but quarterback Jared Barnett was intercepted with 2 minutes to go, and the Cowboys were immediately in field goal range. After the Cyclones forced a 4th-and-1 at the 20-yard line, Oklahoma State opted to try a field goal with just over a minute remaining, but the 37-yard field goal attempt by Oklahoma State kicker Quinn Sharp went wide right, forcing overtime. There, Iowa State scored a touchdown on the first play, while Oklahoma State successfully responded with a touchdown on their own. On the first play of the second overtime, a pass by Heisman candidate Brandon Weeden was tipped and intercepted by Ter'Ran Benton, giving Iowa State a golden opportunity to pull off the upset, which they did after a series of plays that culminated in running back Jeff Woody running into the endzone. Jubilant Iowa State fans then stormed the field.

Oklahoma State racked up 536 yards of total offense, but only gained 60 rushing yards and also committed five turnovers. It was Iowa State's first win over a team ranked sixth or higher in the AP poll.

Aftermath and impact
The game had a considerable impact on the history of college football. With Oklahoma State's loss, Alabama jumped back to second in the BCS standings, and would remain there for the rest of the season. Despite Oklahoma State throttling their rival No. 13 Oklahoma 44–10 in their final game of the regular season, it was not enough to vault them past Alabama in the BCS standings, as Alabama was controversially awarded the second berth in the BCS National Championship Game opposite LSU. Despite Oklahoma State finishing ahead of Alabama in the computer polls that compiled 1/3 of the BCS formula, Alabama's lead in the human polls was too large to overcome. This created the slimmest margin between two teams in the final BCS Standings. Alabama had an average score of .9419 whereas Oklahoma State had an average score of .9333. More controversy came from the BCS formula of this due to the fact that several head football coaches used their vote in the Coaches Poll to diminish OSU's position by voting them No. 4 or lower; among those to do so were Alabama head coach Nick Saban, former Missouri head coach Gary Pinkel, Air Force head coach Troy Calhoun, and Stanford head coach David Shaw. Alabama won the National Championship rematch with LSU 21–0, while Oklahoma State was chosen to play in the Fiesta Bowl against #4 Stanford, which Oklahoma State won 41-38 in overtime. One day after the rematch, the Sporting News reported that the 2012 offseason would be spent building a playoff system. The rematch is cited by some as the catalyst for the movement towards the new College Football Playoff system for determining a consensus national champion in NCAA Division I FBS football, and the catalyst that marked the downfall of Les Miles at LSU. Thus, some has marked this upset as the event that led to Miles' downfall.

Citing the plane crash and the subsequent loss, Weeden called it "one of the hardest days in Oklahoma State history."

4 years later, Oklahoma State found themselves in a similar situation. They were 9–0 and ranked #8, just 3 wins away from making the College Football Playoff, and were playing on the road against Iowa State. This time, the Cowboys prevailed, coincidentally coming back from a 24–7 deficit to win 35–31. However, the Cowboys would lose their final 2 regular season games, and as a result did not make the College Football Playoff.

References

External links
 . November 18, 2011 ESPN
 . November 18, 2011 ESPN broadcast. Uploaded to YouTube on August 4, 2012.

2011 Big 12 Conference football season
vs. Iowa State 2011
vs. Oklahoma State 2011
November 2011 sports events in the United States
2011 in sports in Iowa